Christopher Hollis may refer to:
 Christopher Hollis (politician) (1902–1977), British schoolmaster, author and MP
 Christopher Hollis (rugby union) (born 1998), South African rugby union player